A list of Bangladeshi films released in 1995.

Releases

See also

1995 in Bangladesh

References

Film
Bangladesh
 1995